The Dutch have a code of etiquette which governs social behaviour and is considered important. Because of the international position of the Netherlands, many books have been written on the subject. Some customs may not be true in all regions and they are never absolute. In addition to those specific to the Dutch, many general points of European etiquette apply to the Dutch as well.

The people 
The author Colleen Geske stated in her book Stuff Dutch People Like that "Dutch people consider the English or American forms of politeness a sign of weakness, and reeking of insincerity and hypocrisy. These are two traits Dutch people despise".

Research for Dutch world service radio concluded that just over half of the Dutch people living abroad consider their compatriots at home less well-mannered than other nationalities. In particular, waiters, teenagers and shop staff score badly. Some 55% of Dutch expats think the Dutch have become ruder since they left the country.

The Dutch and foreign languages 
Addressing the Dutch in their native language may result in a reply in English. This phenomenon is humorously discussed in White and Boucke’s The UnDutchables:

Humor 
In the 16th century, the Dutch were renowned for their humor throughout Europe, and many travel journals have notes on the happy and celebratory nature of the Dutch. Farces and joke books were in demand and many Dutch painters chose to paint humorous paintings, Jan Steen being a good example. 
The main subjects of Dutch jokes at the time were deranged households, drunken clerics (mostly of the Roman Catholic Church) and people with mental and/or physical handicaps. A main theme was the reproof of immoral ethics: the 'Vicar's wagging finger'. However, at the end of the 17th century, the Dutch Republic was in decline, and the Dutch Reformed Church denounced laughter and advocated sober lifestyles. Etiquette manuals appeared which considered it impolite to laugh out loud. This continued into the 1960s: during World War II, American soldiers were instructed not to tell jokes to the Dutch as "they would not appreciate it".

Miscellaneous 
Many Dutch surnames start with a tussenvoegsel, i.e. a prefix such as 'de' (the) or 'van' (from or of). These are neglected in alphabetical order. So a Dutchman named 'de Vries' will say his last name starts with a 'V', and you'll find him in a telephone directory under that letter. In addition, if the first name or initial is mentioned, 'de' or 'van' starts with a lower case letter. If the first name or initial is absent, the prefix starts with a capital letter. E.g. "Jan de Vries" or "J. de Vries", versus "meneer De Vries" (Mister De Vries).
The majority of the Dutch are irreligious and religion in the Netherlands is generally considered as a very personal matter which is not supposed to be propagated in public.

See also 

 Etiquette in Europe
 Intercultural competence
 Dutch honours system

References

External links
 Dutch Ditz - Manners in the Netherlands (2nd print 2011), by Reinildis van Ditzhuyzen  Website Reinildis van Ditzhuyzen (English).
 Dealing with the Dutch: A Guide for Visitors, New Residents and Better Business Relationships, by Jacob Vossestein.

Society of the Netherlands
Etiquette by region